Melanoma-associated antigen 3 (MAGE-A3) is a protein that in humans is encoded by the MAGEA3 gene.

Genetics 

This gene is a member of the melanoma-associated antigen gene family. The members of this family encode proteins with 50 to 80% sequence identity to each other. The promoters and first exons of the MAGEA genes show considerable variability, suggesting that the existence of this gene family enables the same function to be expressed under different transcriptional controls. The MAGEA genes are clustered at chromosomal location Xq28. They have been implicated in some hereditary disorders, such as dyskeratosis congenita.

Function and Clinical relevance 

The normal function of MAGE-A3 in healthy cells is unknown. The presence of the antigen on tumor cells has been associated with worse prognosis. In one study, high levels of MAGE-A3 in lung adenocarcinoma were associated with shorter survival.

MAGE-A3 is a tumor-specific protein, and has been identified on many tumors including melanoma, non-small cell lung cancer, hematologic malignancies, among others. Currently, GlaxoSmithKline is developing a cancer vaccine targeting MAGE-A3.  The vaccine is a fusion protein of MAGE-A3 and Haemophilus influenzae protein D, combined with a proprietary immunoadjuvant.

References

Further reading